The 2022 Turkish Basketball Cup, also known as Bitci Erkekler Türkiye Kupası for sponsorship reasons, was the 36th edition of Turkey's top-tier level professional national domestic basketball cup competition. The quarterfinals of tournament were held from 15 to 16 February 2022 in 4 different locations and then semi-finals and the final were held from 18 to 20 February 2022 in the Tofaş Nilüfer Spor Salonu in Bursa, Turkey. Anadolu Efes won the competition by defeating Fenerbahçe Beko 86–72 in the final.

Qualified teams 
The top eight placed teams after the first half of the top-tier level Basketball Super League 2021–22 season qualified for the tournament. The four highest-placed teams played against the lowest-seeded teams in the quarter-finals. The competition was played under a single elimination format.

Draw
The 2022 Turkish Basketball Cup was drawn on 7 February 2022. The seeded teams were paired in the quarterfinals with the non-seeded teams.

Bracket

Quarterfinals

Semifinals

Final

See also
2021–22 Basketbol Süper Ligi

References

External links
Official Site

Turkish Cup Basketball seasons
Cup
Turkish Basketball Cup